Leroy Richard Arthur "Roy" Kettle OBE (born 1949) is a retired United Kingdom civil servant who, among many other achievements, was one of the principal architects of the Disability Discrimination Act 1995.

Science fiction fans know Kettle as a prolific co-author with John Brosnan, publishing under the names Harry Adam Knight and Simon Ian Childer. With Greg Pickersgill, he was a leading light of "Ratfandom" in London in the 1970s. He produced two science fiction fanzines, Fouler (with Pickersgill) and True Rat, both noted for their acid humour; and participated in the oneshot fanzine An Egregious Guide To The Conventions with Pickersgill.

He married Kathleen in 1985, with whom he has two children, Jennifer and Nathan, and lives in Hitchin, Hertfordshire.

References

External links

British civil servants
British science fiction writers
Living people
Officers of the Order of the British Empire
1949 births